National Highway 117A, commonly called NH 117A is a national highway in  India. It is a spur road of National Highway 17.  NH-117A traverses the state of Assam in India.

Route 
Bilasipara - Kokrajhar - Garubhasa.

Junctions  

  Terminal near Bilasipara.
  Terminal near Garubhasa.

See also 
List of National Highways in India by highway number

List of National Highways in India by state

References

External links 

 NH 117A on OpenStreetMap

National highways in India
National Highways in Assam